Parkkinen is a Finnish surname. Notable people with the surname include:

Keijo Parkkinen (born 1965), Finnish orienteering competitor
Lassi Parkkinen (1917–1994), Finnish speed skater
Sulo Parkkinen (1930–2013), Finnish footballer

See also
Parkkonen

Finnish-language surnames